Shancheng (lit. "Mountain City" or "Mountain Fortress") may refer to several places in China:
 District
 Shancheng District of Hebi City, Henan 
 Towns
 Shancheng, Nanjing County, a town in and the county seat of Nanjing County, Fujian
 Shancheng, Taining County (杉城), in Taining County, Fujian

See also 
 Shangcheng (disambiguation)
 Yamashiro (disambiguation), Japanese placename and personal name, usually written with the same Chinese/Japanese characters, and with a similar meaning, as the Chinese "Shancheng"